Giornata  is an art term, originating from an Italian word which means "a day's work."  The term is used in Buon fresco mural painting and describes how much painting can be done in a single day of work. This amount is based on the artist's past experience of how much they can paint in the many hours available while the plaster remains wet and the pigment is able to adhere to the wall.

Origins 
Knowing how much can be painted in a day is crucial in the Buon fresco technique. In this technique a water based paint, without binder, is applied to wet lime plaster which binds the paint into the surface of the plaster when it dries, making for an extremely durable painting. Wet plaster is applied to the wall in the right amount needed for each day's work. That amount is the giornata. Generally the plaster is applied in a way that will conform to the outline of a figure, or object, in a painting, so that the daily segments will not show, but it is occasionally visible as different sections in a work where the artist may not have been able to replicate a pigment exactly the next day, or where restoration has altered or made apparent the changes in pigment between the sections.

Once the artist is done with painting for the day, the excess plaster is scraped off to prevent it from drying. Through this process, the next morning the artist can come and start with fresh, wet plaster that is ready to be painted on.

Giornata can also refer to applying mortar in the process of creating a mosaic. When looking at the mortar, you can spot a giornata by seeing "joints" or differences in area.

Notes 

Fresco painting
Painting techniques